Kent Street in Perth, Western Australia is a major access road to many facilities and places like Curtin University and the Perth Hockey Stadium.

Kent Street is approximately 7.5 kilometres in length, running south-west from Albany Highway through to Manning Road.  Kent Street forms the boundary between the City of South Perth and the Town of Victoria Park.

Significant buildings
The Park Recreation Centre (Leisurelife Centre) is located at the northern end of the road, at its intersection with Gloucester Street. The Park Recreation Centre being the main indoor recreation centre for the Town of Victoria Park.  Kent Street is also the street address for Kent Street Senior High School, which was the first state government school to be built south of the Swan River.

Kent Street also runs through the centre of Technology Park Bentley, which houses a number of innovative Research and Development based organisations, including Perth's CSIRO building and one of Australia Post's major freight factories.

Curtin University is also located on Kent Street. Curtin University is Western Australia's largest university with over 40,000 students.

The Karawara (Village Green) Shopping Centre is located at the southern end of Kent Street, on the north-western side of its intersection with Manning Road.

Significant parks and reserves
A number of parks and reserves front onto Kent Street, including Kensington Bushland Reserve. John McMillan Park, Harold Rossiter Park, Barblett Oval and Endiburgh Oval.  The Collier Park Golf Course is also located along Kent Street.

Kent Street is a dual carriageway road between Manning Road and Hayman Road, with a major round-about at that intersection. Road verges in some parts of Kent Street have been set aside for future widening.

See also

References

Roads in Perth, Western Australia
Kensington, Western Australia